Rebecca Ruth Pallmeyer  is the Chief United States district judge of the United States District Court for the Northern District of Illinois.

Education and career

Pallmeyer was born September 13, 1954 in Tokyo, Japan. Pallmeyer received a Bachelor of Arts degree from Valparaiso University in 1976 and a Juris Doctor from the University of Chicago Law School in 1979. She was a law clerk to Rosalie E. Wahl, Minnesota Supreme Court Justice, from 1979 to 1980. She was in private practice in Chicago, Illinois from 1980 to 1985 at the law firm of Hopkins & Sutter. She was an administrative law judge on the Illinois Human Rights Commission from 1985 to 1991. She was a United States magistrate judge of the United States District Court for the Northern District of Illinois from 1991 to 1998.

Federal judicial service

Pallmeyer was nominated by President Bill Clinton on July 31, 1997, to a seat on the United States District Court for the Northern District of Illinois vacated by Judge William Thomas Hart. She was confirmed by the United States Senate on October 21, 1998, and received her commission on October 22, 1998.

On July 1, 2019 she became Chief Judge of the Northern District of Illinois.  She is the first female to do so, in the nearly 200 years of the court's existence.

See also 
 List of first women lawyers and judges in Illinois

References

External links

1954 births
Living people
Valparaiso University alumni
Judges of the United States District Court for the Northern District of Illinois
United States district court judges appointed by Bill Clinton
United States magistrate judges
People from Tokyo
20th-century American judges
21st-century American judges
20th-century American women judges
21st-century American women judges